Johann Bollig (23 August 1821 – 9 March 1895) was an influential German advisor of Pope Pius IX in the lead up to the First Vatican Council. Bollig was born near Düren, Rhenish Prussia, and died in Rome, Italy. Prior to his time as a Pontifical Theologian he served as a theology professor in Syria.

References

19th-century German Jesuits
1821 births
1895 deaths
19th-century German Catholic theologians
19th-century German male writers
19th-century German writers
German male non-fiction writers